The Petite-Nation River is a river in western Quebec, Canada, that flows from the Laurentian Mountains to empty into the Ottawa River near Plaisance, Quebec.

This river's French name refers to the Algonquin people that inhabited this region, the Weskarini, which means "people of the little nation". The valley of the Petite-Nation was part of the Seigneury de la Petite-Nation, originally owned by the Lord François de Laval, the first archbishop of New France. Joseph Papineau acquires it from Séminaire de Québec in two parts, in 1801 and 1803. Joseph Papineau sold the seigneury to his son, Louis-Joseph Papineau, in 1817. Denis-Benjamin, Joseph's second son, is the lord of the seigneury. In 1929, the Papineau domain was sold off and became the Seigniory Club, which in turn later was acquired by Canadian Pacific hotels, now known as Fairmont.

Louis-Joseph Papineau built a sawmill on the river at the Chutes du Diables Falls. A village, named North Nation Mills was part of the seigneury owned by Louis-Joseph Papineau. He was a former rebel, in Lower Canada, who was operating the mill at the time and developed at this site. Pine logs were floating down the river to the mill. The owners of the mill changed a few times : from the Papineau family to the Cooke family, and then the Gilmour family, and finally to the Edwards and the McClarens. The village was demolished in 1920 after the sawmill was shut down.

The area near the river's mouth was flooded by a Hydro-Québec dam on the Ottawa River. A Quebec park is located in this area.

There is also the South Nation River in Ontario which empties into the Ottawa River.

Rivers of Outaouais